DXRR (1017 AM) Radyo Rapido is a radio station owned and operated by Kalayaan Broadcasting System, Inc., a subsidiary of ANFLOCOR Group of Companies. The station's studio is located at DAMOSA Gateway, J.P Laurel Ave. cor. Mamay Rd., Davao City, and its transmitter is located at Bugac, Brgy. Ma-a, Davao City.

History
The station was founded in 1960 as DXGE. At that time, it was owned by Liberty Broadcasting Corporation. Tony Vergara, Jimmy Torres and Fred Colas were among the notable personalities of the station. In 1988, the then-newly inaugurated Kalayaan Broadcasting System acquired the station and changed to its current callsign. Its transmitter was formerly located at Malacanang Munong.

References

Radio stations established in 1960
Radio stations in Davao City
News and talk radio stations in the Philippines